USS Ammonoosuc may refer to:

 
 , the original name for USS Bagaduce (AT-21)

United States Navy ship names